The Evangelical Church of Anhalt (Evangelische Landeskirche Anhalts) is a United Protestant member church of the Evangelical Church in Germany. Its seat is in Dessau-Roßlau in Saxony-Anhalt, in the former duchy of Anhalt.

The Evangelical Church of Anhalt is affiliated with 214 churches in approximately 150 parishes in central Saxony-Anhalt. In December 2020, the church had 28,403 members, making its membership the smallest among the member churches of the Evangelical Church in Germany. In 1922, by contrast, the church counted 315,000 parishioners; at the time, it was the twelfth-smallest of Germany's 28 regional Landeskirche. The ordination of women has been allowed.

References

External links

 Official website (German)
 Protestant Church of Anhalt (English)

Anhalt
Christianity in Saxony-Anhalt